Star Fleet Battles Commander's Rulebook, Volume II is a 1984 expansion for Star Fleet Battles published by Task Force Games.

Gameplay
Star Fleet Battles Commander's Rulebook, Volume II completes the task begun with the first volume of Star Fleet Battles Commander's Rulebook: the reorganization and compilation of the rules for Star Fleet Battles in an orderly fashion.

Reception
Craig Sheeley reviewed Star Fleet Battles Commander's Rulebook, Volume II in Space Gamer No. 70. Sheeley commented that "If you want to keep up with the latest rules, to complete your Volume I or to replace your worn-out expansions cheaply, then Volume II is worth its price.  But I must warn you that you can have as much fun with less outlay with just the old rules and expansions."

References

Star Fleet Battles